A death in office is the death of a person who was incumbent of an office-position until the time of death. Such deaths have been usually due to natural causes, but they are also caused by accidents, suicides, disease and assassinations.

The death of most monarchs and popes have been deaths in office, since they have usually held their papacy/reign for the rest of their lives.  As most other office positions require that the incumbent be constantly competent in performing the associated duties, other deaths in office are usually premature deaths.

Consequences 

Systems differ in how they deal with the death of an office holder. In some death results in a casual vacancy, whereby the office is unfilled for a time. The office may subsequently be filled by a by-election or by appointment. A person may temporarily take the powers and responsibilities of the deceased in an "acting" capacity before a permanent replacement is made. In other systems there may be a legally defined order of succession. For example, in hereditary monarchies reigns are typically expected to end with death and the transition of power to an heir. Many presidential systems have offices of vice president, whose principal responsibility is to immediately assume the presidency if the president dies or otherwise leaves the office.

Examples

Heads of state and government

Indonesian governor(s) 
 Rizal Nurdin, governor of North Sumatra, died in a plane crash in 2005

Russian governors 
 Aleksandr Lebed, governor of Krasnoyarsk Krai, died in a helicopter crash in 2002
 Valentin Tsvetkov, governor of Magadan Oblast, killed in 2002
 Igor Farkhutdinov, governor of Sakhalin Oblast, died in a helicopter crash in 2003
 Mikhail Yevdokimov, governor of Altai Krai, died in a car accident in 2005
 Igor Yesipovsky, governor of Irkutsk Oblast, died in a helicopter crash in 2009
 Tamerlan Aguzarov, head of North Ossetia-Alania, died of pneumonia in 2016

Northern Rhodesia governor(s) 
Sir John Maybin, governor of Northern Rhodesia (now Zambia) (1941)

India

Janata dal

Upon the death of a Janata Dal, National General Secretary of the ruling party of India 5 times.
Thakur Ji Pathak in 1994 Gunshot by anti-social elements

United States

U.S. Congress 

Upon the death of a United States senator, the Governor of the senator's home state typically appoints a successor.
 
Upon the death of a member of the United States House of Representatives, a special election is held to pick a successor.

The most recent member of the U.S. Congress to die in office was US Representative Donald McEachin on November 28, 2022, of cancer.

Other notable members who died in office include:
Huey Long, in 1935, of a gunshot wound
Joseph McCarthy, in 1957, of acute hepatitis
Daniel Inouye, in 2012, of respiratory compilations 
John McCain, in 2018, of cancer
John Lewis, in 2020, of pancreatic cancer
Don Young, in 2022, of natural causes

Presidents 

In addition, 8 U.S. presidents died in office, four of which were assassinated.
William Henry Harrison, in 1841 of pneumonia; Harrison died 31 days into his presidency in The White House, the official home of the President, making him the President with the shortest tenure. His pneumonia supposedly escalated from a common cold, acquired after Harrison did his inaugural address, the longest in American history, in the rain without a jacket.
Zachary Taylor, in 1850, of gastroenteritis; Taylor contracted the illness after consuming cherries at a party. Some suspect he was poisoned. He also died in The White House.
Abraham Lincoln, in 1865 of gunshot wounds, while watching a play in Ford's Theater in Washington, D.C., he was shot by John Wilkes Booth and died the next day.
James A. Garfield, in 1881, of septic shock caused by an infection acquired during treatment for gunshot wounds, after being shot by Charles Guiteau. He died in Elberon, New Jersey after being shot in the Baltimore and Potomac Railroad Station in Washington, D.C. 79 days earlier.
William McKinley, in 1901, of gangrene caused by gunshot wounds; he was shot by an anarchist named Leon Czolgosz in Buffalo, New York. McKinley's death famously resulted in Theodore Roosevelt's rise to the Presidency-Roosevelt's leadership is considered one of the most impactful in American history, and would overshadow McKinley's legacy.
Warren G. Harding, in 1923, of heart attack. The popular Harding's sudden death shocked the country; however, his legacy would be overshadowed by the Teapot Dome Scandal and revelations of his extramarital affair with Nan Britton. He was on a western journey and died in San Francisco, California
Franklin D. Roosevelt, in 1945 of a cerebral hemorrhage; Roosevelt had been elected to a historic fourth term a year prior, however his health had been in decline. He died in his vacation home in Warm Springs, Georgia. His long tenure is one of the main reasons for the passing of the Twenty-second Amendment to the United States Constitution, which both limited the President's tenure to two terms and put a long-standing tradition in writing. 
John F. Kennedy, in 1963, of gunshot wounds; while in a motorcade in Dallas, Texas, he was shot by Lee Harvey Oswald and died later that same day.

Curse of Tippecanoe 
A well-known legend is the Curse of Tippecanoe in which Harrison, elected in 1840, was allegedly cursed by a Native American chief during the Battle of Tippecanoe, so that he and future Presidents elected in the years ending in "0" would die in office. The curse also affected Lincoln (1860), Garfield (1880), McKinley (1900), Harding (1920), Franklin D. Roosevelt (1940), and Kennedy (1960). Ronald Reagan, (1980) survived an assassination attempt in 1981, and would become one of the most well-known Presidents in history, popular among conservatives. George W. Bush (2000) also did not die in office. Joe Biden (2020), the incumbent president, is next in line of the curse.

The curse did not affect Taylor, as he was elected in 1848.

State and local levels 

Many mayors (e.g., George Moscone, Harold Washington, Ed Lee) and state governors (e.g., Lurleen Wallace, Lawton Chiles, Frank O'Bannon) have died in office. Similar to the President being succeeded by the Vice President, in most states, the Governor is succeeded by the Lieutenant Governor. Unlike the President, however, mayors are usually succeeded by the president of the city's legislative branch, as acting mayor, upon the mayor's death.

References 

Public administration
Legal aspects of death